This is a list of fossiliferous stratigraphic units in New Brunswick, Canada.

See also

References 
 

New Brunswick
Geology of New Brunswick
Stratigraphy of New Brunswick